Abdallar may refer to:
Abdalar, Zanjan Province, Iran 
Abdarlar, East Azerbaijan Province, Iran
Abdarlar, Azerbaijan, the pre-1926 name for the town of Lachin